WUS may refer to: 
 Wuyishan Airport (IATA code WUS)
World University Service, international organisation